Darko Micevski (born 12 April 1992) is a Macedonian footballer, who plays for Vardar.

Club career
Born in Skopje, he played in the youth team of FK Rabotnički before moving to Serbia in summer 2009 and joining FK Sevojno playing in the Serbian First League, later merged with FK Sloboda Užice and promoted to the 2010–11 Serbian SuperLiga.  During the winter break of the 2010–11 season he returned to Macedonia and joined his former team FK Rabotnički where he played in the First Macedonian Football League for 2 years.  During the winter break of the 2012–13 season he moved to another Macedonian top league sid, FK Teteks, having helped them to win the Macedonian Cup that season by scoring the only goal for his team at the final.  He played with Teteks in their 2013–14 UEFA Europa League qualifying matches, before returning to Serbia and after a trial joining OFK Beograd.  He made his debut for OFK in the 2013–14 Serbian SuperLiga as a substitute in the 3rd round match against FK Čukarički.

International career
Micevski represented Macedonia at U-17, U-19 and U-21 levels.

Honours
Teteks
Macedonian Cup: 2012–13

References

1992 births
Living people
Footballers from Skopje
Association football midfielders
Macedonian footballers
North Macedonia youth international footballers
North Macedonia under-21 international footballers
North Macedonia international footballers
FK Sevojno players
FK Sloboda Užice players
FK Rabotnički players
FK Teteks players
OFK Beograd players
FK Novi Pazar players
FC Minsk players
Nejmeh SC players
FK Vardar players
FK RFS players
Macedonian First Football League players
Serbian SuperLiga players
Belarusian Premier League players
Lebanese Premier League players
Macedonian expatriate footballers
Expatriate footballers in Serbia
Macedonian expatriate sportspeople in Serbia
Expatriate footballers in Belarus
Macedonian expatriate sportspeople in Belarus
Expatriate footballers in Lebanon
Macedonian expatriate sportspeople in Lebanon
Expatriate footballers in Latvia
Macedonian expatriate sportspeople in Latvia